What's Going On is an album by jazz organist Johnny "Hammond" Smith recorded for the Prestige label in 1971.

Reception

The Allmusic site awarded the album 3 stars.

Track listing
All compositions by Johnny "Hammond" Smith except where noted
 "What's Going On" (Renaldo Benson Al Cleveland, Marvin Gaye) - 9:45  
 "Smokin' Cool" - 6:53  
 "L and J" (James Clark) - 5:45  
 "I'll Be There" (Hal Davis, Willie Hutch, Berry Gordy, Bob West) - 5:20  
 "Between the Sheets" - 9:49

Personnel
Johnny "Hammond" Smith - organ
Robert Prado, Ernie Royal - trumpet (tracks 1, 3 & 4)
Garnett Brown - trombone (tracks 1, 3 & 4)
Grover Washington Jr. - tenor saxophone
Richard Landry - tenor saxophone (tracks 1, 3 & 4)
Babe Clarke - baritone saxophone (tracks 1, 3 & 4)
James Clark (tracks 1-3 & 5), Ted Dunbar (track 4) - guitar 
Jimmy Lewis - electric bass
Eddie Gee - drums
Unnamed string section (tracks 1, 3 & 4)
Bill Fischer - arranger (tracks 1, 3 & 4)

Production
 Bob Porter - producer
 Rudy Van Gelder - engineer

References

Johnny "Hammond" Smith albums
1971 albums
Prestige Records albums
Albums produced by Bob Porter (record producer)
Albums recorded at Van Gelder Studio